The Frontenac Flyers were a Junior ice hockey team based in Verona, Ontario, Canada.  They played in the Empire B Junior C Hockey League of the Ontario Hockey Association.

History
The Frontenac Flyers were founded in 1989 as members of the Eastern Ontario Junior C Hockey League.  They get their name from the county in which Verona is located, Frontenac County, Ontario.

The Flyers' first season proved to be an excellent one.  In thirty regular season games, the Flyers finished in second place overall with a record of twenty-three wins and only seven losses.  In just their second season in the league, the Frontenac Flyers won their league title.

In 1993, the Frontenac Flyers renamed themselves the North Frontenac Flyers.  The reason for the name change is not all together known.  Two seasons later, the Eastern Ontario Junior C Hockey League changed its name to the Empire B Junior C Hockey League top avoid confusion with the Ottawa District Hockey Association's Eastern Ontario Junior C Hockey League.

In 2002, the Flyers won their second ever league title.  From that point on, the Flyers have suffered in the Empire B league.  In 2004, the teams changed their name back to just the "Frontenac Flyers".

The 2005–06 season has proven to be the low point thus far in the Flyers' history.  Frontenac finished the regular season in dead-last place and posted a winless record of no wins, thirty-four losses, and no ties.  This marked the worst season in Frontenac Flyers history, just two years displaced from their 2004 league championship.  Due to the rules of the season, the Flyers still made the playoffs.  In the league quarter-final, the Flyers drew the Amherstview Jets who squashed them 3-games-to-none.

The 2006–07 season showed minor improvement, but the Flyers still finished in last place. Re-building the club with 15 rookies and adding new staff to the Flyers front office the Flyers are making a huge commitment to the future. With only three wins on the season, the Flyers failed to make the league playoffs.  As of 2007, the Flyers have yet to win the regular season top seed, but have still won two playoff championships.

In July 2010, the Flyers executive folded the club.

Season-by-season results

External links
Frontenac Flyers - Home

Empire Junior C Hockey League teams
1989 establishments in Ontario
2011 disestablishments in Ontario
Ice hockey clubs established in 1989
Ice hockey clubs disestablished in 2011